Robert Julius Brawley (1937 - April 14, 2006) was an American painter, known for his rich still life and figure works.

Brawley gained a Bachelor of Fine Arts in 1963 and a Master of Fine Arts in 1965 from the San Francisco Art Institute.  As a student, he was an abstract expressionist painter, but after happening upon the work of Flemish realists, while studying at the Academy of Fine Arts, in Florence, Italy, and departing for Northern Europe to view more Netherlandish work, he turned toward representational painting, primarily still lifes and figure work. Many of his still lifes are symbolic and, although often described as a realist or hyperrealist, in a 1988 interview he remarked, "I don't think I'm a realist....I'm an illusionist."

His works are on display in the National Museum of American Art, Art Institute of Chicago, Nelson-Atkins Museum of Art in Kansas City, Missouri, and other venues.  His work has been mentioned in many books and magazine articles.

He was a professor, and chairman of the art department at the University of Kansas.

Brawley died in 2006 after a six-month battle with cancer.

External links
The Smithsonian American Art Museum
Art Institute Chicago
Spencer Museum of Art
The Nelson-Atkins Museum of Art

Sources
Newspaper Article, Lawrence Journal World
Askart.com entry

References

1937 births
2006 deaths
20th-century American painters
American male painters
21st-century American painters
21st-century American male artists
San Francisco Art Institute alumni
University of Kansas faculty
20th-century American male artists